The 2020 Toronto Defiant season was the second season of Toronto Defiant's existence in the Overwatch League. The Defiant were scheduled to host two homestand weekends in the 2020 season at Roy Thomson Hall in the Toronto Entertainment District, but both were cancelled in light of the COVID-19 pandemic as the league transitioned to online play. The team ended the season with a 7 wins, 1 bonus win, and 14 losses. The Defiant and were knocked out of postseason contention by the Los Angeles Gladiators in the North American Play-ins bracket.

Preceding offseason

Organizational changes 
In early September 2019, assistant coach Matthew "Optidox" Sims, who assisted the team with head coaching duties in 2019 after head coach Lee "Bishop" Beoum-jun was released, left the team. The following month, the team announced that former Paris Eternal head coach Félix "Féfé" Münch would be Toronto's new head coach. In late October, the team parted ways with assistant coach Sim "Mobydik" Seung-Bo and, one day later, hired David "Lilbow" Moschetto as a coach.

Roster changes 
The Defiant enter the new season with no free agents, ten players which they have the option to retain for another year, and no players under contract. The OWL's deadline to exercise a team option is November 11, after which any players not retained will become a free agent. Free agency officially began on October 7.

Acquisitions 
The Defiant's first offseason pick-up was on October 23, when the team acquired Young-seo "KariV" Park from the Los Angeles Valiant. A week later, KariV was joined by his former teammate, as DPS Brady "Agilities" Girardi signed with Toronto. The team signed tank Adam "Beast" Denton from Philadelphia Fusion's academy team Fusion University on October 30.

On November 4, the Defiant announced the signing of former Los Angeles Gladiators DPS player Lane "Surefour" Roberts. The following day, they signed former Boston Uprising support Kristian "Kellex" Keller. The team then picked up former San Francisco Shock flex-tank Andreas "Nevix" Karlsson on November 7.

Departures 
On October 7, the Defiant announced that they would not exercise their option to retain flex tank Daniel "Gods" Graeser. The following day, they announced that they would elect to not retain DPS Hong "im37" Jin-ui, support Go "Aid" Jae-yoon, and tank Normunds "sharyk" Faterins. Their roster overhaul continued, as Toronto announced they would not pick up main tank Jo "Yakpung" Gyeong-mu's option the following week. In late October, the Defiant announced that they would also not retain Lee "Ivy" Seung-hyun, and they would not retain support Park "Neko" Se-hyeon.

Regular season

Season start 
The Defiant opened the season with a 3–1 win over the Paris Eternal. A subsequent close 3–2 loss to the Philadelphia Fusion marked the first loss of the season, followed by consecutive losses to the Atlanta Reign, Florida Mayhem, and Houston Outlaws. The emergence of the COVID-19 pandemic forced all OWL matches into online play, and led the league to introduce a new format involving multiple midseason tournaments: the May Melee, Summer Showdown, and Countdown Cup.

Head coach Féfé announced his retirement from professional Overwatch for personal reasons on April 14, 2020. Assistant coach David "Lilbow" Moschetto was promoted to interim head coach in his place.

May Melee 
May was marked with several roster changes for the Defiant. On May 1, 2020, support player Kellex announced his retirement from professional Overwatch. The team signed Harrison "Kruise" Pond from the Paris Eternal to fill his role; due to the constraints of the ongoing pandemic, Kruise competed for the Defiant from the Paris Eternal team house. Damage player Mangachu transitioned to a full-time coaching role on May 13, 2020. Toronto also signed damage player Thomas "zYKK" Hosono to a 14-day contract on May 22, 2020.

Toronto entered the May Melee as the 12th seed, facing off with the retooled Vancouver Titans in a qualification match they won 3–2. However, the Defiant were promptly swept by the Atlanta Reign 3–0 and eliminated from the tournament.

Summer Showdown 
On June 2, 2020, the Defiant announced the signing of tank player Seb "numlocked" Barton, initially as an assistant coach but then as a player. Barton had formerly been signed to the Los Angeles Valiant, but had been released by the Valiant at the end of the 2017-2018 season. The team primarily fielded numlocked as the starting main tank for the remainder of the season over Beast.

General Manager Jae-sun Won announced his departure from the Defiant and retirement from professional Overwatch on June 7, 2020.

The Defiant entered the Summer Showdown as the 11th seed, and were selected by the fifth-seeded Los Angeles Valiant for their knockout stage matchup. However, with the prevailing Genji-focused metagame at the time, ushered in by buffs to the hero's abilities prior to the tournament, the Defiant were able to best the Valiant 3–1 with former Valiant player Agilities' Genji as the centrepiece. The Defiant narrowly defeated the Atlanta Reign 3–2 in the subsequent quarterfinal, before falling 3–0 at the hands of the Philadelphia Fusion in the tournament semifinals.

On June 21, 2020, the team announced that zYKK had been upgraded to a long-term contract.

Countdown Cup 
Toronto entered the Countdown Cup as the eighth seed following victories over the Washington Justice and Vancouver Titans, 3–0 and 3–2, respectively, but were knocked out in the first round by the Los Angeles Gladiators, 3–2.

Postseason 
Leading up to the playoffs, Toronto lost back-to-back games to the San Francisco Shock and Dallas Fuel, entering the playoffs as the ninth seed. The team went up against the sixth-seeded Los Angeles Gladiators once more in their first match-up and lost 3–2 to end their season.

Roster

Transactions 
Transactions of/for players on the roster during the 2020 regular season:

 On May 1, support Kristian "Kellex" Keller retired.
 On May 2, the Defiant acquired support Harrison "Kruise" Pond from the Paris Eternal.
 On May 22, the Defiant signed DPS Thomas "zYKK" Hosono to a 14-day contract.
 On June 2, the Defiant signed tank Seb "numlocked" Barton.
 On June 21, the Defiant extended Thomas "zYKK" Hosono to a long-term contract.

Standings

Game log

Regular season

Midseason tournaments 

| style="text-align:center;" | Bonus wins awarded: 1

Postseason

Awards 
Agilities, Kariv, and Nevix were selected to play in the 2020 All-Star Game. Logix, while not selected as an all-star, was invited to the Widowmaker 1v1 tournament during All-Star weekend.

References 

Toronto Defiant
Toronto Defiant
Toronto Defiant seasons